Straws in the Wind is a 1924 British silent drama film directed by Bertram Phillips and starring Betty Ross Clarke, Queenie Thomas and Fred Paul.

Cast
 Betty Ross Clarke as The Wife 
 Queenie Thomas as The Woman 
 Fred Paul as The Husband 
 Ivo Dawson as The Brute 
 Clifford Cobbe as The Man 
 Daisy James as The Friend 
 C. Hargrave Mansell as The Thinker 
 Jessie Matthews as The Village Maiden (uncredited)

References

External links

1924 films
British silent feature films
1924 drama films
Films directed by Bertram Phillips
British drama films
British black-and-white films
1920s English-language films
1920s British films
Silent drama films